The Shikoku proportional representation block was one of 11 multi-member districts (and 306 districts overall) that were contested at the general election for the House of Representatives in the Japanese National Diet on 14 December 2014. Six seats were available for election via open party lists. Prime Minister Shinzo Abe's Liberal Democratic Party (LDP) maintained their dominance in the predominantly rural area, claiming three of the seats.

Voters who participated in the election cast one ballot for the proportional block and a separate ballot for one of the 11 smaller single-member districts that are located within Shikoku. The number of single-member districts within Shikoku was reduced from the 13 districts that were contested at the previous election in 2012.

Results

Following on from the LDP landslide win at the 2012 general election, in which the party won 12 of the 13 electorates in Shikoku plus two of the six seats from the PR list, the LDP maintained their dominant position in the region by retaining all 10 of their electorates (two electorates were abolished to address voter malapportionment) and gaining a seat on the PR list from the dissolved Japan Restoration Party (JRP).

The JRP, which won 2 seats with 21.3% of the vote at the 2012 general election, had split in May 2014, with former members subsequently forming the Japan Innovation Party and Party for Future Generations.

Former  member  the Japan Innovation Party's unsuccessful candidate in Ehime 2nd district, gained a seat for the new party, while the Democratic Party of Japan (DPJ) and Komeito representatives were able to retain their seats.

Party lists

Liberal Democratic Party

Democratic Party of Japan

Komeito

Japan Innovation Party

Japanese Communist Party

Party for Future Generations

Social Democratic Party

Happiness Realization Party

References

General elections in Japan
2014 elections in Japan
December 2014 events in Japan